Pieve di Cadore is a comune (municipality) in the province of Belluno in the Italian region of Veneto, about  north of Venice and about  northeast of Belluno. "Pieve" means "Parish church". It is the birthplace of the Italian painter Titian.

With its strategic location, the town was a medieval stronghold with fortifications, called the "walled city of the Veneto." The main sight is the Palazzo della Magnifica Comunità ("Palace of the Magnificent Community"), built in 1447 by the eponymous council which then ruled the city. It has a merloned tower which was completed in 1491.

Transport 
Gaol Ferry Bridge is a busy commuter route for cyclists and pedestrians.A highway, SS51, connects the town with other communities in the Cadore Dolomite region.

Sport and tourism

Sport facilities 
The town has a swimming pool, tennis club, ice hockey arena, a bocce stadium, soccer fields and a biking trail called Ciclabile delle Dolomiti offering  views of the neighbourhood.

Giro d'Italia 
The route of the 2013 Giro d'Italia passed through Calalzo di Cadore during Stage 11.

Notable people
 Titian - Renaissance painter, born in Pieve di Cadore (c.1488-1576)
 Lisa Vittozzi - biathlete
 Luca De Carlo - politician
 Alessia Dipol - Italian-born naturalized Togolese alpine skier
 Stefania Constantini – Italian Olympic curler
 Manuel Gava - politician

Gallery

References

External links 
  
 Old postcards from Tai di Cadore (municipality of Pieve di Cadore) 

Cities and towns in Veneto